The coat of arms of Kirklees Metropolitan Borough Council was granted on 24 June 1974. This was just a few months after the district of Kirklees was created as part of the new metropolitan county of West Yorkshire. It is rarely used by the Council who, until 2007, preferred to use a logo that is based upon the arms.

The green shown on the shield signifies the green fields that form a large part of the district's outlying rural areas. This is intersected by a silver bend along with a wavy blue lines. These features represent the M62 motorway, which traverses the north, and the rivers and canals of the district. The two cogs represent the industrial heritage of the area with its many mills. The Paschal lamb is the emblem of John the Baptist, the patron saint of wool workers. The crest of a ram's head is a synonymous symbol of Huddersfield for many years. It was also displayed on the arms of Mirfield. The ram's head sits on a mural crown which is common on municipal arms. The purple lion supporters are taken from the arms of the de Lacy family who were medieval lords of Huddersfield.

Blazon
The formal description, or blazon, of the arms is:
For the arms: Vert on a Bend Argent a Bendlet wavy Azure on a Chief Or a Pale between two Cog-Wheels Azure on the Pale a Pascal Lamb supporting a Staff Or flying therefrom a forked Pennon Argent charged with a Cross Gules; and for the crest: On a Wreath of the Colours a Ram's Head affronty couped Argent armed Or gorged with a Mural Crown Sable masoned Argent; and for the supporters: On either side a Lion rampant guardant Purpure resting the inner hind leg on a Cross Crosslet Or embellished in each of the four angles with a Fleur de Lis Azure; Motto: 'TOGETHER WE SERVE'.

References

Kirklees
Kirklees
Kirklees
Kirklees
Kirklees
Kirklees
Kirklees
Kirklees